The 1932 Oldenburg state election was held on 29 May 1932  to elect the 46 members of the Landtag of the Free State of Oldenburg.

Results

References 

Oldenburg
Elections in Lower Saxony